Chess with different armies (or Betza's Chess or Equal Armies) is a chess variant invented by Ralph Betza in 1979. Two sides use different sets of fairy pieces. There are several armies of equal strength to choose from, including the standard FIDE army. In all armies, kings and pawns are the same as in FIDE chess, but the four other pieces are different.

Rules and armies 
Before the game players choose their armies in a certain way, predefined by tournament rules. This can be done either randomly or secretly by both players. Each player has a choice of 4 armies: the Fabulous FIDEs, which are the standard chess pieces, the Colorbound Clobberers, the Nutty Knights, and the Remarkable Rookies.

All armies are designed to be equal in strength but have significantly different properties. Kings and pawns move the same as in chess for all armies. Pawns can only promote to pieces of either army on the board at the start. Castling is done as in standard chess with the exception of the case when the rook replacement is colorbound, like in the Colorbound Clobberers army. In the latter case, the king, when castling long, moves to b1, and the rook replacement to c1. This is so that colorbound pieces do not change square color.

Many pieces in the following armies are combinations of standard chess pieces and 4 fairy pieces: ferz, alfil, wazir and dabbaba (see their movement diagrams above). The game can be played with standard chess pieces, and the following move diagrams use standard pieces as well (except queens).

Colorbound Clobberers 
In this army, rooks, knights, bishops, and queen are replaced by the following pieces:

As mentioned, when using this army and castling queenside, the king moves three squares (from e1 to b1) and the bede moves from a1 to c1.

Nutty Knights 
This army includes a lot of leapers, but most of them have asymmetrical move patterns, with backward moves being restricted.

Remarkable Rookies 
The rooks, knights, bishops, and queen are replaced by the following pieces:

Unofficial armies 
The four armies described above were playtested by Ralph Betza and selected as the most balanced ones. There are other armies, invented by Betza and other people, some of which are presented here.

In the initial version of the game, there were 8 armies and, in these armies, the king moved differently from the king in the standard chess. Instead of normal pawns, fairy pawns could be selected – for example, Berolina pawns. However, later Betza abandoned the idea of using fairy pieces for king and pawns and reduced the number of armies to four.

All-Around Allstars (Ralph Betza) 
This army is made of one piece from each of the main armies. Out of the 12 eligible combinations, as the FAD from the Colorbound Clobberers is considered too strong for a Bishop equivalent and the Cardinal from the same army too weak for a Queen equivalent, Ralph Betza considers the following to be the "official" all-star team. The rooks, knights, bishops, and queen are replaced by the following pieces:

Amazon Army (Ralph Betza) 
In this army, rooks and queen are replaced by the following pieces:

Cylindrical Cinders (Ralph Betza) 
The rooks, knights, bishops, and queen are replaced by the following pieces:

Fighting Fizzies (Peter Aronson) 
In this army, the left rook, the right rook, knights, bishops, and queen are replaced by the following pieces:

Avian Airforce (Ralph Betza) 
In this army, the rooks, knights, bishops, and queen are replaced by the following pieces:

Spacious Cannoneers (Ralph Betza) 
In this army, the rooks, knights, bishops, and queen are replaced by the following pieces:

Forward FIDEs (Ralph Betza) 
The rooks, knights, bishops, and queen are replaced by the following pieces:

Pizza Kings (John Lawson) 
The rooks, knights, bishops, and queen are replaced by the following pieces:

Meticulous Mashers (Ralph Betza) 
The rooks, knights, bishops, and queen are replaced by the following pieces:

Seeping Switchers (Jörg Knappen) 
The rooks, knights, bishops, and queen are replaced by the following pieces:

Daring Dragons (H. G. Muller) 
The rooks, knights, bishops, and queen are replaced by the following pieces:

Bent Bozos (H. G. Muller) 
The left and right rooks, left and right knights, left and right bishops, and queen are replaced by the following pieces:

References 

Chess variants